On October 15, 2018, 21-year-old Jake Thomas Patterson abducted American 13-year-old Jayme Lynn Closs from her family's home in Barron, Wisconsin. The attack took place at 12:53 a.m after he forced his way inside and fatally shot her parents.

Police took Patterson into custody; shortly after, he told them he kidnapped Closs and killed her parents. He pleaded guilty to two counts of first-degree intentional homicide and one count of kidnapping. On May 24, 2019, Patterson was sentenced to two consecutive life sentences in prison without the possibility of parole plus an additional 40 years. After her recovery, Jayme Closs now lives with an aunt and an uncle.

Kidnapping
Jayme Lynn Closs (born July 13, 2005) is the only child of James and Denise Closs of Barron, Wisconsin. On October 5, 2018, Jake Patterson drove to the Closs home to kidnap Jayme Closs. Activity in the home deterred him, as he was afraid he would leave witnesses. Patterson made a second attempt two days later but again aborted for the same reason. On October 15, he made a third visit, this time armed with a shotgun. Shortly before 12:53 a.m. Central Time (05:53 UTC), Patterson parked his car at the end of the driveway. Wearing a black coat and ski mask, he approached the front door of the home, carrying the shotgun. James Closs, 56, shone a light on Patterson through a glass pane in the front door and asked him to show him his badge. Patterson called out, "Open the fucking door!" Patterson fired once, fatally shooting Closs. Forcing his way into the house, Patterson checked every room in the house because he wanted "no witnesses left behind." He found the bathroom door locked and began shooting it down. Inside the bathroom were Denise Closs, 46, and Jayme. Denise was comforting Jayme, who was crying loudly. At 12:53 a.m., Denise Closs made a 911 call.

While Denise Closs did not speak, the operator heard a disturbance and yelling before the phone call disconnected. When the dispatcher called the number back, they reached the voicemail of Denise Closs. Patterson bound Jayme's wrists and ankles using duct tape, then fatally shot Denise Closs. He dragged Jayme outside, almost slipping on blood, placed her in the trunk of his car, and drove away. The police arrived four minutes after the 911 call. Patterson later told investigators that he pulled over 20 seconds down the road from the house. Deputies sped by with emergency lights and sirens on. Neighbors said they heard two gunshots but dismissed them since hunting was common around their homes. After arriving at his cabin, Patterson made Closs change into a different pair of pajamas, then forced her under his mattress and sealed off all exits before going to sleep.

Escape
Patterson believed that Closs was too afraid of him to make any escape attempts. He “never put special locks on doors because she wouldn’t escape.” They also slept on the same bed. Patterson would rarely let Closs out of the cabin, only for brief walks on the lawn after checking for bystanders. On the afternoon of January 10, 2019, Patterson told Closs he was leaving for a couple of hours. He put her under his bed before boxing her inside with his belongings, per his usual routine. After he departed, Closs pushed out the objects around the bed. She ran from the house wearing a light shirt, leggings, and a pair of Patterson's sneakers. Closs came across a local woman, Jeanne Nutter, walking her dog. Nutter recognized Closs from news reports and immediately took her to a neighbor's house. After police were called, Closs told them "Jake Patterson" had killed her parents, taken her, and kept her prisoner just a few houses away from her current location in the neighborhood. The neighbors described Closs as calm, quiet, dazed, and surprised that they recognized her from news coverage.

The police arrived around 4:45 p.m. and removed Closs from the area for her safety. The description Closs provided for Patterson and his vehicle enabled deputies to spot his car just minutes afterwards when Patterson drove by the house. After a deputy stopped him, Patterson exited his vehicle and said, "I did it."

A hospital admitted Closs under guard. The next morning, they released her to the custody of her aunt, Jennifer Smith. Hormel, the parent company of the Jennie-O store where Closs's parents worked, announced on January 24 that they would grant $25,000 reward money to Closs for rescuing herself.

Perpetrator

Patterson's parents divorced in 2007. He graduated from Northwood High School in nearby Minong, Wisconsin in 2015. He enlisted in the U.S. Marine Corps, but was discharged after one month at MCRD San Diego.

Police did not believe Patterson had any social media contact with Closs or her family and relatives of Closs did not recognize Patterson's name. Patterson told authorities he saw Closs getting off a school bus outside the family residence in September while he was driving home from work and that he "knew that she was the girl he wanted to take". Patterson's grandfather stated, "Something went terribly wrong, nobody had any clues... We are absolutely heartbroken. It's wrenching to deal with. He was shy and quiet, he backed off from crowds, but a nice boy, polite. Computer games were more of a priority than social interaction."

Legal
Patterson confessed to police that he had kidnapped Closs and killed her parents. He had no previous criminal history in Wisconsin. He was charged with two counts of first-degree intentional homicide, one count of kidnapping and one count of armed burglary on January 14, 2019, with bail set at $5 million. On March 27, he pleaded guilty to two counts of intentional first-degree homicide and one count of kidnapping.

The judge agreed to dismiss the armed burglary count. On May 24, Patterson was sentenced to the maximum of two consecutive life sentences in prison without the possibility of parole for the murders plus an additional 40 years for the kidnapping. Douglas County authorities did not pursue charges against Patterson related to Closs's 88 days in captivity because they did not want to bring Closs in for questioning and believed there was sufficient evidence to pursue a life sentence without parole without needing additional charges.

While in jail in March, Patterson wrote a letter in response to questions sent to him by a reporter from a television station in Minneapolis. He apologized for his crimes and stated they were committed "mostly on impulse", contrasting with reports from the police that he had taken various measures in preparation for the crime. He added that his intention from the beginning was to plead guilty in order to spare Closs and her family the trauma of the case going to trial. Later that month, a television reporter in Minneapolis received a cell phone call from Patterson in which he briefly answered questions sent to him in a letter. Regarding the time Closs spent in captivity, Patterson said, "We were just like watching TV, playing board games, talking about stuff. We cooked a lot, everything we made was homemade, you know".

At Patterson's arraignment, his father had told a reporter that he had a note of apology that he was trying to get to Closs. On June 20, Jake Patterson was registered officially as a sex offender. In July, he was transferred from the Dodge Correctional Institution to an out-of-state prison in New Mexico and got in a fight with another inmate in August 2019.

See also 
 List of homicides in Wisconsin
 Lists of solved missing person cases

References

External links
 
 

2010s missing person cases
2018 in Wisconsin
2018 murders in the United States
Barron County, Wisconsin
Child abduction in the United States
Crimes in Wisconsin
Deaths by firearm in Wisconsin
Douglas County, Wisconsin
Formerly missing people
Incidents of violence against girls
Kidnapped American children
Living people
Missing person cases in Wisconsin
Murder in Wisconsin
October 2018 crimes in the United States
Year of birth missing (living people)